Paul Stanley (born 1952) is an American musician and co-founder of the band Kiss.

Paul Stanley may also refer to:

 Paul Stanley (album), the musician's 1978 solo album
 Paul Stanley (basketball) (born 1963), American basketball player
 Paul Stanley (composer) (1848–1909), German-born American composer and vaudeville comedian
 Paul Stanley (director) (1922–2002), American television director
 Paul Stanley (legislator) (born 1962), American politician and former member of the Tennessee Senate
 Paul Stanley (speed skater) (born 1983), British Olympic speed skater

Stanley, Paul